Lloyd Park Disc Golf Course is an 18-hole disc golf course located in Calgary, Alberta, Canada. The course was designed by the Calgary Disc Golf Club in 2015. It features concrete tees and pro baskets.

Tournaments 
The course is home to the PDGA-sanctioned Alberta Open tournament.

See also 
List of disc golf courses in Alberta

References

External links 

 
 DG Course Review profile
 PDGA Course Directory profile

Disc golf courses in Alberta